KJYE (1400 AM) is a radio station broadcasting a Religious format. Licensed to Delta, Colorado, United States, KJYE relays the programming of KJOL and is currently owned by United Ministries.

History
The station was assigned the call letters KPLG on March 1, 1986. On January 15, 1988, the station changed its call sign to KDTA. On September 21, 2012, the station changed its call sign to the current KJYE.

References

External links
FCC History Cards for KJYE

JYE
Moody Radio affiliate stations
Radio stations established in 1986
1986 establishments in Colorado